The Battle of Kansala or Final Battle (Mandinka: Turban Keloo) or Siege of Kansala was a military engagement between forces of the Kaabu Empire and the Imamate of Futa Jallon.  The battle ended Mandinka hegemony over Africa’s Atlantic coast begun by the Mali Empire.

Background
In the second half of the 13th century, Sénegambia saw the invasion of Bainouk and Diola territories by the Manden conquerors with a view to the expansion of the Manden empire.
At the end of the 15th century between 1470 and 1790, the Mali empire was seriously threatened by very warlike Fulani waves which would lead to the dismantling of the Manden empire in Sénegambia. The territory of Gabou succeeded in continuing the Manden hegemony. One of the Fulani tribes nevertheless succeeded in establishing itself in the south of Gabou, as the Emirate of Futa Jallon. After the Islamic takeover led to the establishment of Futa Jallon by the Fulani in 1725, the new theocratic state surrounded by animist peoples managed to impose themselves definitively on the region in 1774.

Forces
According to historian Djibril Tamsir Niane, Gabou had 25,000 soldiers, half of whom were present directly in the capital of Gabou where the Battle of Kansala took place. They were mustered by mansaba Dianke Waali to meet the Fulani invasion.

The Futa Jallon would have mobilized 12,000 horsemen, according to the same author, and set off into Gabou, targeting its capital, Kansala.

Siege
Alfa Molo’s forces surrounded Kansala’s fortress for either one or three months, depending on the source.  Though both sides were armed with muskets, neither would fire a shot. According to legend, Abdu Khudus, a prominent marabout from Timbo, told Alfa Yaya that whichever side fired first would lose the battle. Within the Mandinka ranks, a resident marabout named Foday Barika Drammeh told Mansaba Waali the same. The Nyancho were infuriated by the mere presence of the Fula and believed that to not attack was cowardly. It is reported that on May 13, a Mandinka finally fired a shot that caused the battle to commence. The story is likely apocryphal and meant to highlight the hubris and arrogance of the Nyancho aristocrats.

Battle
For eleven days, the Fula, who could not bring their cavalry to bear against the fortress walls, were kept at bay. The only cavalry casualty of the battle may have been a Mandinka named Faramba (General) Tamba of Kapentu whom marched out of Kansala with only his walking stick to drive the “haughty” Fula away. He was trampled to death by a Fula horseman. The Mandinka accounts are of the opinion that Fula took many casualties with hundreds of their infantry being decapitated as they tried to scale the wall with ladders. They failed to enter the city until Mansaba Waali, convinced that the sheer number of enemies was insurmountable, ordered the gates open. At this point, Mandinka women began committing suicide by jumping down wells to avoid slavery. Mansaba Waali ordered his sons to set fire to Kansala’s seven gunpowder stores once the city was full of the enemy. Six were successfully ignited, killing all the Mandinka defenders and around 8,000 of the Alfa Yaya’s army.

Aftermath
The fall of Kansala marked the end of the Kaabu Empire. The Fula army had surrounded Kansala so thoroughly that the neighboring towns could not be warned of the invasion. They were only made aware by the sound of Kansala’s gunpowder stores exploding. Kaabu’s territory was divided up into two tributaries owing allegiance to Futa Jallon. Alfa Molo’s victory is considered pyrrhic in that most of his army died on the walls of Kansala or in its explosion, with only 4,000 troops returning from Kaabu.  Alfa Molo went on to govern the region he had conquered and made his capital at Labé. It became more or less autonomous of Futa Jallon while maintaining close ties to Timbo. Both his realm and a severely weakened Futa Jallon would fall to French rule after the Battle of Pore-Daka in 1896.

See also
Kaabu Empire
Imamate of Futa Jallon
History of Guinea-Bissau

References

Sources

Kansala
1867 in Africa